Horadiz is a city and municipality in the Fuzuli District of Azerbaijan, located on the left bank of the Aras river. As of 2019, it had a population of 7,600 people.

History 
During the Russian Empire, the village of Horadiz was part of the Jebrail Uyezd of Elisabethpol Governorate. According to the "Caucasian calendar" of 1912, the village had 1,424 inhabitants, the majority of whom were Azerbaijanis, who were listed as "Tatars" in the calendar.

Horadiz was designated as an urban-type settlement on 24 September 1947. It had a population of 5,689 people according to the 1989 Soviet census.

During the First Nagorno-Karabakh war the village became the scene of fierce fighting. On 24 October 1993, the village of Horadiz was captured by Armenian forces, which was condemned by UN Security Council Resolution No. 884 of 12 November 1993 and labelled as an occupation. On 6 January 1994, as a result of a counter-offensive, the Azerbaijani army regained control of the village. On 23 October 2007, Horadiz was granted city status.

Economy 
In the post-war period, Horadiz became the unofficial centre of the Fuzuli District, and large projects were implemented in the area of social infrastructure - 24 schools, 2 hospitals, Olympic Sports Complex, youth centre, historical and ethnographic museum, and mugham centre were built, individual houses restored.

Gallery

References 

Populated places in Fuzuli District